The Ekensund Artists' Colony  (German - Künstlerkolonie Ekensund) was a late 19th-century art colony in Egernsund Sogn, now in southern Jutland on the north bank of the Flensburg Firth in Denmark, but then known as Ekensund and part of the Province of Schleswig-Holstein within the German Empire. It drew artists including Wilhelm Dreesen, Alexander Eckener, Otto Heinrich Engel, Emmy Gotzmann, Johannes Knutz, Erich Kubierschky, Jacob Nöbbe, Heinrich Petersen-Angeln, Johann Sander and Fritz Stoltenberg.

Bibliography
  
 
Ekensund im Kreis der Künstlerkolonien an der Ostsee. Ausstellungskatalog Gemäldegalerie Dachau. Dachau 2016, .

References

Artist colonies
German artist groups and collectives
Danish art